Purísima is a town and municipality located in the Córdoba Department, northern Colombia.

References
 Gobernacion de Cordoba - Purísima 

Municipalities of Córdoba Department